The  2022 United States Open Championship was the 122nd U.S. Open, the national open golf championship of the United States. It was a 72-hole stroke play tournament that was played between June 16–19 at The Country Club in Brookline, Massachusetts, a suburb west of Boston. It was the club's fourth U.S. Open, having been held there in 1913, 1963, and 1988.

Matt Fitzpatrick won his first major championship, finishing the tournament with a score of 274, six-under-par, a shot ahead of Scottie Scheffler and Will Zalatoris. The win was also Fitzpatrick's first on the PGA Tour. He had previously won the U.S. Amateur at The Country Club, in 2013, and matched Jack Nicklaus, who won both at Pebble Beach, as the only players to win the U.S. Amateur and U.S. Open on the same course. Zalatoris, who lost in a playoff a month earlier at the PGA Championship, had a 14-foot birdie putt on the 18th green that would have forced a playoff but missed, and had his second consecutive runner-up finish in a major championship.

Course

Composite Course

Sources:

Field
The field for the U.S. Open is made up of players who gain entry through qualifying events and those who are exempt from qualifying. The exemption criteria include provision for recent major champions, winners of major amateur events, and leading players in the world rankings. Qualifying is in two stages, local and final, with some players being exempted through to final qualifying.

As with all editions of the U.S. Open, eligibility to play is under the sole jurisdiction of the United States Golf Association to the exclusion of the PGA Tour, Professional Golfers' Association of America or any other organization. In early June 2022, several exempt players resigned or were suspended from the PGA Tour in order to compete in the LIV Golf Invitational Series, which held its inaugural event in England one week prior to the U.S. Open. The USGA subsequently confirmed that those players would remain eligible to play in the U.S. Open.

Exemptions
This list details the exemption criteria for the 2022 U.S. Open and the players who qualified under them. Players are listed under the first criterion by which they qualified; any additional criteria under which a player was exempt are indicated in parentheses.

1. Recent winners of the U.S. Open (2012–2021)

Bryson DeChambeau (11,18)
Dustin Johnson (6,11,18)
Brooks Koepka (2,7,11,18)
Jon Rahm (2,11,18)
Justin Rose (18)
Webb Simpson (18)
Jordan Spieth (8,11,18)
Gary Woodland

Martin Kaymer did not play.

2. The leading ten players, and those tying for tenth place, in the 2021 U.S. Open

Daniel Berger (11,18)
Harris English (11,18)
Branden Grace
Rory McIlroy (11,18)
Guido Migliozzi
Collin Morikawa (7,8,11,18)
Louis Oosthuizen (11,18)
Xander Schauffele (11,15,18)
Scottie Scheffler (6,11,12,18)

Paul Casey did not play.

3. The winner of the 2021 U.S. Senior Open

Jim Furyk

4. The winner of the 2021 U.S. Amateur

James Piot

5. Winners of the 2021 U.S. Junior Amateur and U.S. Mid-Amateur, and the runner-up in the 2021 U.S. Amateur

Nick Dunlap (a)
Austin Greaser (a)
Stewart Hagestad (a)

6. Recent winners of the Masters Tournament (2018–2022)

Hideki Matsuyama (11,12,18)
Patrick Reed (11,18)

Tiger Woods did not play.

7. Recent winners of the PGA Championship (2017–2022)

Phil Mickelson
Justin Thomas (9,11,18)

8. Recent winners of The Open Championship (2017–2021)

Shane Lowry (18)
Francesco Molinari

9. Recent winners of The Players Championship (2021–2022)

Cameron Smith (11,18)

10. The winner of the 2021 BMW PGA Championship

Billy Horschel (11,18)

11. All players who qualified for the 2021 Tour Championship

Sam Burns (12,18)
Patrick Cantlay (12,18)
Stewart Cink
Corey Conners (18)
Tony Finau (18)
Sergio García (18)
Viktor Hovland (18)
Im Sung-jae (18)
Jason Kokrak (18)
Kevin Na (18)
Joaquín Niemann (18)
Erik van Rooyen

Abraham Ancer (18) did not play.

12. Winners of multiple PGA Tour events from the 2021 U.S. Open to the start of the 2022 tournament

Max Homa (18)

13. The winner of the 2021 Amateur Championship

Laird Shepherd (a)

14. The winner of the Mark H. McCormack Medal in 2021

Keita Nakajima (a)

15. The winner of the 2020 Olympic Gold Medal

16. The leading 10 points winners from the "European Qualifying Series" who are not otherwise exempt

Wil Besseling
Ryan Fox
Sam Horsfield
Richard Mansell
Thorbjørn Olesen
Yannik Paul
Victor Perez
Kalle Samooja
Marcel Schneider
Sebastian Söderberg

17. The leading player from each of the 2020–21–22 Asian Tour, 2021–22 PGA Tour of Australasia and 2021–22 Sunshine Tour Orders of Merit

Tom Kim
Jediah Morgan
Shaun Norris

18. The leading 60 players on the Official World Golf Ranking as of May 23, 2022

Adri Arnaus
Richard Bland
Keegan Bradley
Matt Fitzpatrick
Tommy Fleetwood
Talor Gooch
Brian Harman
Tyrrell Hatton
Russell Henley
Lucas Herbert
Tom Hoge
Kim Si-woo
Kevin Kisner
Lee Kyoung-hoon
Min Woo Lee
Marc Leishman
Sebastián Muñoz
Alex Norén
Mito Pereira
Thomas Pieters
Séamus Power
Adam Scott
Sepp Straka
Cameron Tringale
Harold Varner III
Cameron Young
Will Zalatoris

19. The leading 60 players on the Official World Golf Ranking if not otherwise exempt as of June 6, 2022

Luke List 
Aaron Wise

20. Special exemptions

Qualifiers
Eleven final qualifying events were held, nine of which were in the United States:

Alternates who gained entry
The following players gained a place in the field having finished as the leading alternates in the specified final qualifying events:
Adam Hadwin (Dallas)
Nick Hardy (Springfield)
David Lingmerth (Columbus)
Patton Kizzire (Roswell)

Round summaries

First round
Thursday, June 16, 2022

Adam Hadwin led after the opening day, after a four-under-par round of 66, which included six birdies. Five players were a stroke behind after rounds of 67. A total of 25 players scored under the par of  70 and a further 16 scored level par, so that 41 players were within four strokes of the leader.

Source:

Second round
Friday, June 17, 2022

Joel Dahmen and Collin Morikawa led after the second round with scores of 135, 5-under-par. Morikawa's 66 was the best round of the day. Defending champion Jon Rahm was in a group of five players a stroke behind, while world number one Scottie Scheffler was in another group of five a further shot behind. Overnight leader Adam Hadwin had a 72 to be three strokes behind the leaders. 64 players made the cut, which came at 143, 3-over-par.

Source:

Third round
Saturday, June 18, 2022

Matt Fitzpatrick and Will Zalatoris led after the third round with scores of 206, 4-under-par. Zalatoris's 67 was the best round of the day. Jon Rahm was in third place, a stroke behind, with Scottie Scheffler in a group of three a further shot behind. The overnight leaders, Joel Dahmen and Collin Morikawa, dropped down the leaderboard with Dahmen scoring 74 and Morikawa 77.

Source:

Final round
Sunday, June 19, 2022

Summary
Beginning the round tied for the lead with Will Zalatoris, Matt Fitzpatrick went two-under-par on his front-nine to take a one-shot advantage into the final nine holes at six-under-par. He then bogeyed the 10th hole and three-putted the 11th for another bogey, to fall back to four-under and two strokes behind the leaders. Fitzpatrick holed a 48-foot birdie putt at the 13th hole, to draw level with Zalatoris and retook sole possession of the lead with a 19-foot putt at the 15th.

Zalatoris bogeyed two of his first three holes and was as many as four shots behind the leaders. He then made three birdies in four holes from the 6th hole to the 9th and took the lead with an 18-foot birdie putt at the 11th hole. He bogeyed the 12th and the 15th, after failing to get up-and-down from a greenside bunker, and fell back to four-under-par, before hitting his tee shot on the par-three 16th hole to six feet and making the putt to get within one of Fitzpatick.

Zalatoris had a 12-foot putt for birdie on the 17th hole to draw level with Fitzpatrick, but missed the putt. With a one-shot lead playing the 18th, Fitzpatrick drove into a fairway bunker and played his second shot 18 feet past the hole. He two-putted for par and a round of 68, two-under-par, to finish at six-under for the tournament. Zalatoris, on a nearly identical line to Fitzpatrick, had a 14-foot putt for birdie that would have forced a playoff but it narrowly slid past the left side of the hole. He finished at five-under-par and his second consecutive runner-up finish in a major championship.

World No. 1 and Masters champion Scottie Scheffler made four birdies in his first six holes to take the lead. He then bogeyed the 10th and three-putted the 11th, where his short par putt lipped out of the cup. Despite a birdie on the 17th, Scheffler finished at five-under-par, tied with Zalatoris and narrowly missing becoming only the seventh player to win both the Masters and U.S. Open in the same year.

Hideki Matsuyama had a bogey-free round of 65, the lowest recorded during the week, to jump up to three-under-par and finished alone in fourth place. Defending champion Jon Rahm began the round just a shot off the lead but made five bogeys and only one birdie in a four-over-par 74 to fall outside the top-10, finishing tied for 12th.

Final leaderboard

Source:

Scorecard

Cumulative tournament scores, relative to par

Source:

Notes

References

External links

United States Golf Association
Coverage on the PGA Tour's official site
Coverage on the European Tour's official site
Media Guide

U.S. Open (golf)
Golf in Massachusetts
Sports competitions in Massachusetts
Sports in Brookline, Massachusetts
U.S. Open
U.S. Open (golf)
U.S. Open
U.S. Open